MOSTown (formerly Sunshine City) is a shopping centre in the town centre of Ma On Shan in the Sha Tin District of Hong Kong. It was developed by Henderson Land Development, and contains a series of high-rise residential tower blocks and a series of shopping arcades.

Residential towers
There are residential towers above MOSTown, containing in excess of 5,000 residential units, were constructed in five phases during the 1990s. The majority of units are between 40 and 60 square metres. Each phase was built together with a shopping arcade. Phase 5 is also known as Tolo Place.

Shopping centre

The shopping centres for phases 1 to 3 are relatively small. "Sunshine Bazaar" is the name given to Phase 5 of the mall.

Location and access
Sunshine City Plaza is located on Sai Sha Road, adjacent to the MTR Ma On Shan station, has nowadays become the centre of Ma On Shan. It is across from the Ma On Shan Plaza.

Ma On Shan Town Centre bus terminus is located underneath Sunshine City Plaza. Ma On Shan station of the MTR Tuen Ma line was opened in 2004, and is connected to Sunshine City Plaza by a footbridge. The resulting improvement in transport has been an important factor for the increase in the number of visitors to Sunshine City Plaza.

See also
 New Town Plaza - A major shopping centre in Sha Tin District.

References

External links

Ma On Shan
Shopping centres in Hong Kong
Private housing estates in Hong Kong